Neubrandenburg – Mecklenburg-Strelitz – Uecker-Randow was a constituency in Mecklenburg-Vorpommern for the elections to the German Bundestag from 2002 to 2013.

History 
The constituency was formed for the 2002 federal elections and bore the constituency number 17.
The constituency was last contested at the 2009 election after which the state lost one Member of the Bundestag.

The area of ​​the Greifswald – Demmin – Ostvorpommern constituency was divided into two new constituencies:

 Mecklenburgische Seenplatte I – Vorpommern-Greifswald II
 Mecklenburg Lake District II - Rostock District III

Geography 
The constituency covered the city of Neubrandenburg and the districts of Mecklenburg-Strelitz and Uecker-Randow.

Members

Election results

2009 German federal election

References 

Defunct electoral districts in Mecklenburg-Western Pomerania
2002 establishments in Germany
Constituencies established in 2002
2013 disestablishments in Germany
Constituencies disestablished in 2013